Toto Sena Govou (born 23 December 1989) is a Beninese football striker who notably played for the Corgoň Liga club MFK Košice. He made his debut for Košice against Senica on 22 April 2011.

External links
at mfkkosice.sk

References

1989 births
Living people
Beninese footballers
Association football forwards
FC VSS Košice players
Slovak Super Liga players
Beninese expatriate footballers
Expatriate footballers in Slovakia
Beninese expatriate sportspeople in Slovakia
FC Aurillac Arpajon Cantal Auvergne players
Requins de l'Atlantique FC players
Expatriate footballers in France
Beninese expatriate sportspeople in France